Penton is a motorcycle brand.

Penton may also refer to:

 Penton, Alabama
 Penton, New Jersey
 Penton Mewsey, a village in Hampshire, England
 Penton (company), a business-to-business media company
 Penton (surname)

In geometry "penton" refers to a pentagonal face of a polygon that includes pentagonal faces.  For example, a regular dodecahedron contains 20 pentagonal faces, or 20 pentons.  This use of the term penton appears in the article on Adenoviridae in the description of the capsid of this family of viruses.